Cross-Cultural Solutions  also known as CCS, was a New Rochelle, New York-based non-for-profit working to address critical global issues by providing volunteer service to communities abroad, and contributing responsibly to local economies. The organization used a community-designed approach to international volunteering. Cross-Cultural Solutions was operating in nine countries worldwide: Brazil, Costa Rica, Ghana, Guatemala, India, Morocco, Peru, Tanzania, and Thailand.

Volunteers assisted with education, health-care and community development projects.

References

Sources
 The Huffington Post - 5 Things You Can't Do in Ghana as a Tourist
CNN.com - More older Americans signing on to volunteer abroad
TIME - Volunteer Vacations

See also
 Cross-Cultural Solutions website

International volunteer organizations
Companies based in New Rochelle, New York